FIELD OF VIEW II is the second studio album by Japanese group Field of View. The album was released on October 2, 1996 by Zain Records. The album reached #4 on the Oricon chart for the first week with 167,230 sold copies. It charted for 11 weeks and sold 368,740 copies.

Track listing

Usage in media
Dan Dan Kokoro Hikareteku was used as the opening theme for the anime series Dragon Ball GT.
Wake up was used in a commercial for the "Astel Kansai Corporation".
Doki was used in a commercial for All Nippon Airways' "ANA's Paradise" promotion.
Last Good-bye was used as the ending theme for the Tokyo Broadcasting System Television drama "Discovery of the World's Mysteries"

Cover
Zard covered Last Good-bye on the album, Kimi to no Distance and Dan Dan Kokoro Hikareteku on the album, Today is Another Day.

References 

1996 albums
Being Inc. albums
Japanese-language albums
Field of View albums